XEROK-AM (800 kHz) is a commercial radio station in Ciudad Juárez, Chihuahua, Mexico.  It is licensed to operate with a power of 150,000 watts on a carrier frequency of 800 kHz, although its new transmitter is now powered at 50,000 watts.  The station calls itself "Radio Cañón."

XEROK is the dominant Class A station on 800 AM, a Mexican clear channel frequency.  The station had a colorful history as a border blaster, aiming its programming at listeners in the United States, when at night, its 150,000-watt signal could be easily heard in many parts of the Southwest.

History
The callsign changed to XELO in 1936, authorized for 50 kW day from Piedras Negras but on 1110 kHz. It was the first station in Piedras Negras, operated by W. E. Branch and Claudio Bres Jáuregui from studios at the Hotel del Ferrocarril. The binational structure of the radio station—it earned 95 percent of its advertising revenue from American accounts—caused tax issues in the United States, where a sister company, The Radio Service Co., had been established in Eagle Pass, Texas, across the border. In Eagle Pass, it made $72,000 in advertising revenue in 1936 and $66,000 in 1937, prompting scrutiny by the Internal Revenue Service and a lawsuit that the company won. A spark in one of the transmitter facilities for XELO, knocking it off the air, would serve as a pretext for the station to relocate from Piedras Negras to Ciudad Juárez.

When the station relocated to Ciudad Juárez, it moved to 800 kHz and tripled its power. The 150 kW plant was custom-built in 1940–1941 by a team led by William "Bill" Branch, an early well-known radio engineer. Branch built a series of amplifiers to get power from low power oscillator level to the 150 kW level. Modulation was achieved by Doherty modulation, which while complicated, allowed extremely high levels (exceeding 100% positive), of modulation and did not require large (and generally poor-performing 'Modulation Reactor') (ie. Tramformer)), audio coupling transformers.

One of the border blaster stations aimed at American listeners, the long time format was Spanish-language programs by day and brokered time programs (very often in English) targeted to audiences in the U.S. "Carr Collins Crazy water crystals" (a mineral treatment and patent medicine) was a well known advertiser, as was "Baby Chicks by Mail". Some listeners remember hearing religious programs were aired, sometimes with offers to send money in exchange for "autographed photos of J. Christ of Biblical fame". In the years following World War II and during and following the Korean War, U.S. troops returning by sea from the Orient heard their first US-based radio broadcasts from this station, which frequently aired a radio evangelist who offered "send five dollars for your free autographed picture of Jesus Christ with eyes that glow in the dark."

The daytime line-up moved in 1972 to a U.S. station, KAMA 1060 (now KXPL) in El Paso, Texas. Around that time, a group of American investors ( Grady Sanders, Bob Hanna, John Ryman and Bruce Miller Earle) leased the station and turned it into an English language top 40 radio station, with XELO being changed to XEROK.  In the 1970s and into the 1980s, the station promoted itself as X-Rock 80, The Sun City Rocker due to its proximity to the "Sun City", El Paso. In spring 1975, XEROK was the highest rated top 40 radio station in the United States, with the possible exception of New York's WABC, according to Arbitron.

It is not generally known that XEROK was live in only brief periods of operation due to Mexican government restrictions on foreign language programming. At the beginning the programs were recorded, in real time, on tape and the tapes were carried by messenger to the transmitter site where they played after a 24-hour delay, a concept similar to voice-tracking used by many stations today; this allowed the announcers to announce real clock times, but not material that is required to be accurate and timely, such as accurate weather forecasts. The exception, by 1975, was "morning drive" programming, which was on a 4-hour delay that allowed for timely news and weather reports. Later, the recordings were made 12 hours ahead of time. Still later the station ran several parallel studios so that four shifts were recorded at a time. In 1977-78 studios were used at the tower near Satélite, Chihuahua for live operation. Eventually, the owners were granted permission from the FCC to install a 950 MHz studio-transmitter link (STL) across the border to feed the transmitter from El Paso live. The Mexican government also agreed to this arrangement but later, the station's top 40 demise halted the STL connection and all programming came out of the local Mexican studios after that.

XEROK continued for a few years with immense popularity in El Paso, and much of the Southwest, but was eventually overtaken by an FM top 40 station (KINT-FM 97.5), as pop music listeners migrated to the FM band during the second half of the 1970s. In 1982, the station began a full-time, Spanish-language format as "Radio Cañón", the name the station still uses today.

Operation
The station usually operated with 50,000 watts days (extra power was more or less wasted by day, as the ground wave could not be pushed far enough to reach more population. By night, the skywave transmission was helped by extra power sometimes to as high as 150,000 watts.

The Bill Branch-built transmitter was used until 1971, when a CCA transmitter was installed. It was also the cause of Branch's death in 1946, when he received a fatal shock while working on it. Later they got a Continental Electronics 150 kW unit. The Continental required a couple of minutes to change from low to high power settings, and the manual operation of switches in the front and the back. The station now uses a 50 kW Harris DX-50.
Its base of operation and studios in El Paso were at 2100 Trawood, now the location of Grupo Radio Centro's El Paso operations (namely XHTO-FM).
There is open feed line out to the tower.

References

External links
Airchecks of XELO

Radio stations in Chihuahua
Spanish-language radio stations
Radio stations established in 1930
Mass media in Ciudad Juárez
Clear-channel radio stations